Jukka "Jugi" Rasila (born 12 August 1969 in Oulu, Finland) is a Finnish actor and voice actor.

Career

Rasila is best known for starring in several television comedy programs, such as Studio Julmahuvi, Putous and Ihmebantu, while often appearing on stage and in films. In 2010, Rasila competed in the fifth season  of Tanssii tähtien kanssa, a Finnish version of the British television series Strictly Come Dancing, and finished in third place. Also frequently working as a voice actor, Rasila has served as the Finnish voice of Donald Duck since May 1993.

Selected filmography

In films
Pieniä valheita (1994)
FC Venus (2005)
Kummelin Jackpot (2006)
Kummeli Alivuokralainen (2008)
Risto Räppääjä ja polkupyörävaras (2010)
Prinsessa (2010)
Herra Heinämäki ja Leijonatuuliviiri (2011)
Kummeli V (2014)
Se mieletön remppa (2020)

On television
Häkkilinnut (1991)
Toini ja Heikki Haaman Show (1995–1996)
Studio Julmahuvi (1998)
Tummien vesien tulkit (2002)
Kymenlaakson laulu (2008)
Ihmebantu (2009)
Putous (2010–2014)

References

External links

Finnish male film actors
1969 births
Finnish male television actors
Living people
Actors from Oulu